ACME Newspictures sometimes credited as Acme News Photos was a United States-based news agency  that operated from 1923 to 1952.

History
ACME operated from 1923 to 1951, under the auspices of Newspaper Enterprise Association. Earlier it was known as United Newspictures. It was bought out by United Press in December 1951.  Corbis has some of the images in its collection, while some are held by the New York Public Library.

ACME Newspictures was located at 220 E 42nd Street, New York, NY. Phone number was MUrray Hill 2-3191.

Name
Acme News
Acme News Photos
Acme Newspictures
Acme Photographs
Acme Photos
Acme Telephoto

References

External links

News agencies based in the United States
Photo archives in the United States